Marthe may refer to:

Marthe (given name) a feminine given name
Marthe (novel), an 1876 novel by Joris-Karl Huysmans
Marthe, an 1877 play by Georges Ohnet
Marthe (film), a 1997 film by Gérard Jugnot

People with the surname
William Marthé (1894–?), Swiss long-distance runner

See also
Sainte-Marthe (disambiguation)
Martha (disambiguation)
Marta (disambiguation)
Marte (disambiguation)
Marth (disambiguation)